Otto Roelen (22 March 1897 – 30 January 1993) was a German chemist.

Roelen was born in Mülheim, Germany and studied chemistry and graduated in 1922 from Technische Hochschule Stuttgart. He worked with Franz Fischer and Hans Tropsch at the Kaiser Wilhelm Institute for Coal Research from 1922. He developed the homogeneously catalysed hydroformylation process (also known as the "oxo synthesis") for the industrial synthesis of aldehydes from alkenes and carbon monoxide.

During the second world war he was chief chemist for Ruhr Chemie, and after the war he described the construction, operation and yields of oxo synthesis plants in detail to British Department of Scientific and Industrial Research interrogators.

Roelen was awarded the Adolf von Baeyer prize by the Gesellschaft Deutscher Chemiker in 1963. In his honor, DECHEMA named the Otto Roelen prize after him.

He died  in Bad Honnef, Germany, at the age of 95.

References

External links
Life and work (Technische Universität Braunschweig)

20th-century German chemists
People from Mülheim
1897 births
1993 deaths